The Wolf River is a river in the Municipal District of Bonnyville No. 87 and Lac La Biche County in census division No. 12, Alberta, Canada. It is in the Hudson Bay drainage basin and is a left tributary of the Sand River.

Course
The river begins at an unnamed swamp, flows west to Wolf Lake, and continues west to its mouth at the Sand River. The Sand River empties via the Beaver River and the Churchill River to Hudson Bay.

See also
List of rivers of Alberta

References

Rivers of Alberta
Tributaries of Hudson Bay